Tambet Tuisk (born 23 May 1976) is an Estonian actor. He has appeared in more than twenty films since 1999.

Selected filmography

References

External links 

1976 births
Living people
Estonian male film actors